The Federal University of Viçosa (UFV; , spelled with a c-cedilla) is a Federal University with the main campus located in the city of Viçosa, state of Minas Gerais, Brazil.
The university began as the Higher College of Agriculture and Veterinary Science created in 1922 but with classes only beginning in 1927. In 1948 it was transformed into the Rural University of Minas Gerais. It was federalized in 1969 with its present name.

This institution is a prestigious university in Brazil. UFV offers 47 different undergrad courses in many areas, including engineering, agronomy, medicine, veterinary medicine, animal husbandry, and other areas related to science. The university has a highly regarded Graduate School as well, offering 36 Master's degree programs and 24 for at PhD level.

Viçosa has had a longstanding relationship with Purdue University (USA) and its College of Agriculture, which continues to this day. In the 1950s and 1960s, numerous members of Purdue's faculty stayed in Brazil for several years to help build and strengthen the program at Viçosa. Those that went include Ellsworth Christmas (former Purdue Professor of Agronomy), Jules Janick (Purdue Professor of Horticulture), Doug Knudson (Purdue Professor of Forestry), and D. Woods Thomas, former Associate Dean and Director of International Programs in Agriculture at Purdue University. 
  
In recent years, the university has had multiple exchange programs with universities in several countries, especially Latin America and African countries that speak Portuguese. There have also been exchange agreements with universities in the United States and Canada, through which UFV sends a Brazilian student to the University of Florida or the University of Georgia for each U.S. student sent to the Universidade Federal de Viçosa, for example. There is also an exchange program with the Netherlands "Living Lab Biobased Brazil" which is an exchange program between universities of applied science in the Netherlands and multiple universities in Brazil. The Office of International Affairs (DRI) is responsible for managing these agreements.

UFV is recognized mainly by agrarian and exact sciences, recognized by the MEC (Ministry of Education) as the 6th best university in Brazil based on the ENADE (National Student Performance Exam) 2014 exam. It is considered one of the best universities in Brazil, and in the General Index of Institution Courses (IGC) made by the Ministry of Education in 2009 was selected as the 2nd best in Brazil and 1st in the state of Minas Gerais.

See also 
Brazil University Rankings
Universities and Higher Education in Brazil

References

External links 

 

Educational institutions established in 1922
Viçosa
Universities and colleges in Minas Gerais
 
Education International
Federal universities of Brazil